Lev Viktorovich Ivanov (born 19 December 1967) is a Russian professional football coach.

Honours
 Russian Professional Football League Zone Ural-Povolzhye best coach: 2016–17.

References

External links
  Profile at Footballfacts

1967 births
Living people
Russian football managers
FC Tekstilshchik Kamyshin managers
FC Volgar Astrakhan managers
FC Rotor Volgograd managers
FC Dynamo Stavropol managers